Covenant Christian Academy may refer to:

 Covenant Christian Academy (Georgia)
 Covenant Christian Academy (Houma, Louisiana) 
 Covenant Christian Academy (West Peabody, Massachusetts)
 Covenant Christian Academy (Harrisburg, Pennsylvania)
 Covenant Christian Academy (Colleyville, Texas)

See also
 Covenant Christian School (disambiguation)
 Covenant Classical Academy